is a railway freight terminal in Kamisu, Ibaraki Prefecture, Japan, operated by the Kashima Rinkai Railway.

Lines

History
The terminal opened on 12 November 1970.

References

Railway stations in Ibaraki Prefecture
Stations of Kashima Rinkai Railway
Railway stations in Japan opened in 1970